is a retired Japanese long jumper. She won a gold and a bronze medal at the Asian Games in 1970 and 1974, respectively, and placed 15th at the 1972 Summer Olympics.

References

1951 births
Living people
Japanese female long jumpers
Olympic female long jumpers
Olympic athletes of Japan
Athletes (track and field) at the 1972 Summer Olympics
Asian Games gold medalists for Japan
Asian Games bronze medalists for Japan
Asian Games medalists in athletics (track and field)
Athletes (track and field) at the 1970 Asian Games
Athletes (track and field) at the 1974 Asian Games
Medalists at the 1970 Asian Games
Medalists at the 1974 Asian Games
Universiade medalists in athletics (track and field)
Universiade bronze medalists for Japan
Medalists at the 1970 Summer Universiade
Japan Championships in Athletics winners
20th-century Japanese women